Auni Fathiah Binti Kamis is a Malaysian international lawn bowler.

Bowls career

World Championship
Kamis won a silver medal in the fours at the 2012 World Outdoor Bowls Championship in Adelaide.

Other events
Kamis won two silver medals at the 2019 Asia Pacific Bowls Championships in the Gold Coast, Queensland in the triples and fours and has won a gold medal in the pairs in the Lawn bowls at the Southeast Asian Games.

References 

Malaysian female bowls players
Living people
1991 births
Place of birth missing (living people)
Southeast Asian Games medalists in lawn bowls
Southeast Asian Games gold medalists for Malaysia
Competitors at the 2017 Southeast Asian Games
Competitors at the 2019 Southeast Asian Games
Southeast Asian Games bronze medalists for Malaysia
21st-century Malaysian women